Frederick Halsey "Fred" Sheldon (born 14 December 1951) is an American ornithologist.

Early years
Sheldon was born a US citizen at Hörsching in Upper Austria.  He was educated at Yale University where he obtained a BS degree in Geology & Geophysics in 1974 and a PhD in Biology in 1986.

Career
Sheldon has served in various academic positions, most notably as Curator of Birds at the Academy of Natural Sciences of Philadelphia and Curator of Genetic Resources at the Museum of Natural Science Louisiana State University (LSU).  He became a full curator/professor at LSU in 2000, and is currently Director of the Museum of Natural Sciences.  His main areas of research interest are avian systematics and evolution, and the natural history of the birds of the Malay Archipelago, especially those of Borneo.

Publications
As well as numerous scientific papers, especially in the area of molecular phylogenetics and ornithology, publications authored or coauthored by Sheldon include:
 1986 – A Study of the Evolution and Phylogeny of the Herons (Ardeidae) Using DNA-DNA Hybridization. PhD thesis, Yale University.
 2001 – Ornithology of Sabah: History, Gazetteer, Annotated Checklist, and Bibliography. (With Robert G. Moyle and Jody Kennard). AOU Ornithological Monographs 52. American Ornithologists’ Union.

References

American ornithologists
Living people
1951 births
Yale University alumni
Louisiana State University faculty
American science writers